Point of Rocks Tank is a former dam and reservoir now broken, on Rincon Arroyo in Doña Ana County, New Mexico. It lies at an elevation of  about three miles south of Point of Rocks.

The site of this reservoir is thought to be formerly one of Los Charcos del Perrillo, two waterholes of the Paraje del Perrillo a stopping place on the Jornada del Muerto.

References 

Pre-statehood history of New Mexico
Jornada del Muerto
Geography of Doña Ana County, New Mexico
Reservoirs in New Mexico